The undulated antshrike (Frederickena unduliger) is a relatively large species of antbird from the western Amazon in south-eastern Peru, western Brazil, and possibly far south-eastern Colombia. It formerly included the fulvous antshrike, which is found further west, as a subspecies.

The undulated antshrike was described by the Austrian ornithologist August von Pelzeln in 1868 and given the binomial name Thamnophilus unduliger.

References

 Isler, Isler, Whitney, Zimmer & Whittaker (2009). Species limits in antbirds (Aves: Passeriformes: Thamnophilidae): an evaluation of Frederickena unduligera (Undulated Antshrike) based on vocalizations. Zootaxa 2305: 61-68
 Zimmer, K. J. (2010). Split Frederickena unduligera into two species. SACC. Accessed 10 May 2011

External links
Image at ADW

undulated antshrike
Birds of the Colombian Amazon
Birds of the Ecuadorian Amazon
Birds of the Peruvian Amazon
undulated antshrike
undulated antshrike
Taxonomy articles created by Polbot